This is a list of members of the 37th Legislative Assembly of Queensland from 1963 to 1966, as elected at the 1963 state election held on 1 June 1963.

 On 3 August 1963, the Country member for Warwick, Otto Madsen, died. Country candidate David Cory won the resulting by-election on 19 October 1963.
 On 28 March 1964, the Liberal member for Yeronga and Minister for Health and Home Affairs, Winston Noble, died. Liberal candidate Norm Lee won the resulting by-election on 6 June 1964.
 On 12 October 1964, the Labor member for Cairns, Watty Wallace, died. Labor candidate Ray Jones won the resulting by-election on 27 February 1965.
 On 28 February 1965, the Country member for Mirani and Minister for Mines, Main Roads and Electricity, Ernie Evans, died. Country candidate Tom Newbery won the resulting by-election on 15 May 1965.
 On 15 April 1966, the Country member for Logan, Leslie Harrison, died. No by-election was called due to the proximity of the 1966 state election.

See also
1963 Queensland state election
Nicklin Ministry (Country Party) (1957–1968)

References

 Waterson, D.B. Biographical register of the Queensland Parliament, 1930-1980 Canberra: ANU Press (1982)
 

Members of Queensland parliaments by term
20th-century Australian politicians